Lossa Engineering is a Custom motorcycle manufacturer based in  Long Beach, California. Founded in 2007 by Jay LaRossa, it specializes in café racers based on Japanese, Italian and British motorcycles from the 1960s and 1970s.

Lossa Engineering

Lossa Engineering handles from start to finish, the complete build up and restoration/ customizing of vintage motorcycles. Everything from custom fabrication and motor work to paint and upholstery are all done in house. The shop houses new and vintage machines that help them create their made to order motorcycles. Their use of bold colors, custom modifications and their unique twist and style has had such people as the skateboarder and actor Jason Lee buying a few. Currently they are building bikes for people worldwide, shipping them as far away as Norway.

Jay LaRossa

The owner of Lossa Engineering, Jay LaRossa was born in the San Fernando Valley, California, on September 9, 1970. Both sides of his family owned motorcycle dealerships in Southern California.  LaRossa grew up customizing cars and anything with wheels, two wheels or four.  He opened his first business customizing cars and trucks in 1998 and quickly gained world wide recognition with vehicles appearing in magazines from US to Japan.  Jay's shop built several high end vehicles for large aftermarket companies to be displayed at the yearly SEMA Show.  Around 2007 Jay started to focus on motorcycles, because of the love of Café Racers, he decided to build his first one from scratch and never looked back.  Along the way he has taught himself how to do everything including paint and bodywork, custom fabrication, engineering components from scratch, motor work and upholstery.

He has appeared on the first aired episode of Monster Garage, "White Trash", and then worked for Jesse James at West Coast Choppers before starting his second business venture, Lossa Engineering.  Jay and his shop Lossa Engineering will also be featured in an upcoming TV series (airing October 1, 2010) focused solely on Café Racers and the lifestyle.

Media

Lossa Engineering's motorcycles have been featured in several magazines including Café Racer in the US, Cafe Racer Magazine in the UK and Iron horse Magazine.  Their bikes have also won several awards at shows including a 1st place award at the Grand National Roadster Show in Pomona, California.  Several bikes have also been featured and on display at the Long Beach International Motorcycle Show for the past 3 years.

Notes

References

External links

 Lossa Engineering

Motorcycle builders
Companies based in Los Angeles County, California